Arles–Killeen GAA is a Gaelic football club in County Laois, Ireland.

Founded in 1961 the club colours are white with black trim.

The club has won 3 Laois Intermediate Football Championships and in 2006 reached the Laois Senior Football Championship final where they were beaten by Ballyroan Gaels. In 2013 and 2014 they again reached the Laois Senior Football Championship final but were beaten on both occasions by Portlaoise.

Laois senior players Donal Kingston and Paul Kingston and former Laois players Brian McDonald, Donal Brennan and Paul McDonald play or played their club football with Arles–Killeen.

Achievements
 Laois Senior Football Championships: (0)
 Runners-Up 2006, 2013, 2014
 Laois Intermediate Football Championships (3)
 1997, 2001, 2003

Notable players
 Donal Brennan
 Donal Kingston
 Brian McDonald
 Paul McDonald
 Billy O'Loughlin

References

Gaelic games clubs in County Laois
Gaelic football clubs in County Laois